Rectal artery can refer to:
 Superior rectal artery (superior hemorrhoidal artery)
 Middle rectal artery (middle hemorrhoidal artery)
 Inferior rectal artery (inferior hemorrhoidal artery)